Kristine Meredith Flaherty (born June 30, 1985), better known as K.Flay, is an American singer, musician, songwriter, and rapper. Her debut album Life as a Dog was released in 2014, peaking on Billboards Heatseekers Albums chart at No. 2 and Billboards Rap Albums chart at No. 14. In 2016, she signed with Interscope Records as the first artist signed to Dan Reynolds' Night Street Records imprint. At the 60th Annual Grammy Awards, she was nominated for Best Engineered Album, Non-Classical (for Every Where Is Some Where) and Best Rock Song (for "Blood in the Cut").

Early life 
K.Flay was born Kristine Meredith Flaherty in Wilmette, Illinois, on June 30, 1985. She attended nearby New Trier High School. When she was seven, her parents divorced and her mother remarried soon after, bringing in a stepbrother and a stepsister. When she was 14 years old, her biological father—a guitarist who loved all musical genres—died of undisclosed causes related to his alcoholism; many of her songs include references to him. Flaherty's stepfather helped raise her and later adopted her. She has described herself as a tomboy during childhood, preferring baggier clothing and rejecting "all things girly". In 2003, she enrolled at Stanford University, pursuing a double major in psychology and sociology. According to Flaherty, many people she met during her time at Stanford influenced her musical style.

Career

2003–2013: Self-released material and RCA Records 

K.Flay began her music career in 2003, believing that most hip hop hits on the radio were "simplistic, misogynistic and formulaic". After bragging to a friend that she could write similar songs, she wrote "Blingity Blang Blang", which she described as a "low budget rap parody that contained far too many obscenities". After writing and performing the song, Flaherty realized that she enjoyed writing and recording music. She continued to experiment with music by writing songs and performing and recording them on her computer. She released a mixtape called Suburban Rap Queen in 2005, which she produced on her laptop, and began performing.

In 2010, K.Flay released her self-titled EP, and in 2011 self-released the mixtape I Stopped Caring in '96, which she later remarked was a career turning point. K.Flay signed with RCA Records in 2012, releasing two EPs: Eyes Shut in 2012, with songs produced by Liam Howlett from the British band The Prodigy, and What If It Is in 2013. She parted ways with RCA Records in 2013 because of differences of opinion. Upon leaving RCA Records, she left behind more than 60 songs she had written while signed under RCA Records, but no longer owned the rights to. K.Flay has described her time with RCA Records as similar to "an ill-advised marriage".

2014–2015: Life as a Dog 

In late April 2014, K.Flay announced the release of her album Life as a Dog, by offering fans the ability to pre-order via PledgeMusic, reaching 196 percent of her initial goal. She wanted the project to be "DIY [and] self-motivated". It was recorded and produced in New York City, Los Angeles and San Francisco, with the final mix produced at San Francisco's Different Fur.

Life as a Dog was released independently on June 10, 2014. The album reached No. 14 on the Billboard Rap Albums chart No. 2 on the Billboard Heatseekers Albums chart. K.Flay toured extensively once the album was released, including headlining a tour and joining tours with AWOLNATION, Third Eye Blind and Dashboard Confessional in 2014. In 2014 and 2015 she toured Germany, France and other European countries.

K.Flay also performed on the Warped Tour in 2014, saying that it "was almost like an exercise in becoming a better performer".

In 2015, K.Flay collaborated with Louis the Child on their song "It's Strange". The single was praised by Taylor Swift, who added "It's Strange" as one of her "Songs That Will Make Life Awesome" list and was featured on the FIFA 16 soundtrack. The song peaked at number 38 on the Billboard Hot Dance/Electronic Songs chart.

2016–2018: Crush Me and Every Where Is Some Where 

On March 25, 2016, K.Flay released her single "FML".

Later that year, K.Flay announced she had signed to Interscope Records as the first artist signed to Dan Reynolds' Night Street Records imprint. Her EP Crush Me was released 10 days later on August 19. The EP's song "Blood in the Cut" appeared on the soundtrack for XXX: Return of Xander Cage, Netflix's original series "Peaky Blinders", as well as BoJack Horseman (season 4, episode 6), and in a 2017 NFL promo commercial drive.

K.Flay's album Every Where Is Some Where was released on April 7, 2017. The album's first single, "High Enough", was released in March 2017. She was the opening act for the North American and European legs of Imagine Dragons' Evolve Tour. In September 2017, Flay released the book Crush Me, a compilation of notes received from fans.

At the 60th Annual Grammy Awards, "Blood in the Cut" received a nomination for Best Rock Song and Every Where Is Some Where was nominated for Best Engineered Album, Non-Classical.

2019–2020: Solutions and Don't Judge a Song by Its Cover 
On March 1, 2019, K.Flay announced that she was working on her third studio album and released a lyric video for its first single, "Bad Vibes". On March 19, the official music video for "Bad Vibes" was released. On April 29, K.Flay revealed that the new album would be titled Solutions and announced the Solutions Tour. The album was released on July 12, 2019.

In December 2020, during the COVID-19 pandemic, K.Flay released a three-track EP called Don't Judge a Song by Its Cover which saw her covering "Break Stuff" by Limp Bizkit, "Self Esteem" by The Offspring, and "Brain Stew" by Green Day.

2021–present: Inside Voices / Outside Voices 
In April 2021, K.Flay announced that a five-track EP called Inside Voices would be released on June 11. The first song from the EP, "Four Letter Words", was released with a music video on April 23. A second single, "TGIF" featuring Tom Morello of Rage Against the Machine on guitar, was released with an animated visual on May 21.

Later in 2021, K.Flay began livestreaming on Twitch; she uses the platform to interact with fans, host live interviews with other musicians, and create and mix original songs in real time. She also performed at the 2021 Grey Cup halftime show with Arkells and The Lumineers.'' On November 19, she released another five-track EP called Outside Voices. The EP's first single, "Nothing Can Kill Us", was released on October 15; its accompanying music video was released on November 4. A second single, "Weirdo", was released on November 17.

On February 4, 2022, K.Flay released her fourth studio album Inside Voices / Outside Voices. The album combines the Inside Voices and Outside Voices EPs into one album and features two additional tracks called "The Muck" and "Good to Drive".

On November 16, she released "It's Been So Long", her first release since a viral infection earlier in the year caused her to experience sudden sensorineural hearing loss and labyrinthitis, ultimately leading to her becoming completely deaf in her right ear. She wrote on her social media pages that she wrote the song while recovering from COVID-19 and "isolating in a bedroom above a garage" in Tennessee, and that she "worried [she] wouldn't be able to sing or make music like [she] used to" but recording the song felt "like a big step forward".

Musical style and influences 
K.Flay has cited a wide range of musicians such as Royal Blood, Missy Elliott, Garbage, Lauryn Hill, Tame Impala, Jeremih, Metric, M.I.A., OutKast, Liz Phair, Cat Power, and Shlohmo as influences. Her work has covered genres including hip hop, alternative hip hop, indie, and pop rock. She has described her sound as "genre-defying" and draws from lo-fi pop and hip hop with a strong indie component in her sound.

Personal life 
Flaherty resides in Los Angeles. She has hinted at being bisexual in her lyrics and interviews, and was in a relationship with fellow musician Miya Folick from 2018 to 2021.

In September 2022, Flaherty revealed that she had recently experienced sudden sensorineural hearing loss and labyrinthitis, causing her to undergo multiple forms of hearing therapy. In October, she revealed that the treatment had been unsuccessful and that she had gone completely deaf in her right ear. After she began releasing music again later that year, she admitted that she was initially concerned about her ability to keep making music while being totally deaf in one ear, but was adapting to the condition.

Discography

Studio albums

Compilations and mixtapes

Extended plays

Collaborative releases

Singles

As lead artist

As featured artist

Music videos

Appearances

Awards and nominations 
{| class="wikitable sortable"
|-
!Year
!Award
!Work
!Category
!Result
|-
| 2018
| Grammy Awards
| Every Where Is Some Where
| Best Engineered Album, Non-Classical
| 
|-
| 2018
| Grammy Awards
| "Blood in the Cut"
| Best Rock Song
|

References

External links 
Official website

1985 births
20th-century LGBT people
21st-century American rappers
21st-century American women musicians
21st-century LGBT people
American women hip hop singers
American women rappers
American women singer-songwriters
Bisexual singers
Bisexual songwriters
Interscope Records artists
LGBT people from Illinois
LGBT rappers
American LGBT singers
American LGBT songwriters
Living people
Midwest hip hop musicians
New Trier High School alumni
People from Wilmette, Illinois
Rappers from Illinois
Singer-songwriters from Illinois
Stanford University alumni
Twitch (service) streamers
21st-century women rappers